Fatma Yonca Evcimik (born 16 September 1963) is a Turkish pop singer and actress.

Biography

Evcimik studied dance and ballet at the Academy of Music at Mimar Sinan University. In an interview, she revealed that she worked as a sales agent for a life insurance company before starting her career. After graduation, she worked at plays as an actress and dancer. She also acted in the films "Hababam Sınıfı Güle Güle" ve "Kızlar Sınıfı".

Her debut album named "Abone" was released in 1991 and was a great success selling around two million copies. "Kendine Gel" was her second album and was released in 1993. Her third album "Yonca Evcimik '94" was released in 1994. In 1995, she released "I'm Hot For You" followed by her fifth album called "Günaha Davet" in 1998. In 2001, she released "Herkes Baksın Dalgasına" and in 2002 a remix album called "The Best of Yoncimix Remixes".

Discography

Albums 
 Abone (1991)
 Kendine Gel (1993)
 Yonca Evcimik '94 (1994)
 I'm Hot For You (1995)
 Günaha Davet (1998)
 Herkes Baksın Dalgasına (2001)
 15.(2014)

Singles and EPs 
 8:15 Vapuru (1994)
 Yaşasın Kötülük (1997)
 Aşka Hazır (EP, 2004)
 Oldu, Gözlerim Doldu (2005)
 Şöhret (EP, 2008) - (PopCorn & U.ur)
 Tweetine Bandım (2010)
 Yallah Sevgilim (2012)
 Aha! (2016)
 Kendine Gel (2017)
 Ortaya Karışık (EP, 2017)
 Ayıp Şeyler (2020)
 Vurula Vurula (2022)

Remix albums 
 The Best of Yoncimix - Remixes (2002)
 Aha! - Remixler (2016)

Compilation albums 
 5'i Bir Yerde - GOLD (2012)

Filmography
 Golden Girls (TV series) 2009
 You're Cool (TV series) 2010 / Baleci
 Novice Witch (TV series) 2006 /Yonca 
 Selena (TV series) 2006 
 Çılgın Bediş (TV series) 1996 / Çılgın Bediş
 Mr. E (movie) 1995 / Köylü
 The Class of Girls (movie) 1984 / Nurgül
 Hababam Sınıfı Bye Bye (movie) 1981 / Yonca

References
Notes

Sources
 Biyografi.info - Biography of Yonca Evcimik
 Powerclub.com.tr - Yonca Evcimik : Biography and Albums

External links
 
 

1963 births
Living people
Actresses from Istanbul
Singers from Istanbul
Turkish women singers
Turkish pop singers
Turkish dance musicians
20th-century Turkish actresses
Mimar Sinan Fine Arts University alumni
Turkish film actresses
Turkish stage actresses